Kelsey Renee Daugherty (born December 31, 1996) is an American professional soccer player who plays as a goalkeeper for Racing Louisville FC of the National Women's Soccer League.

Early life
Daugherty started playing in her hometown of Kennesaw, Georgia. She was part of Harrison High School's state championship-winning team in 2014.

College career
As a Blazer, Daugherty racked up dozens of honors and awards, capping her career by being named Conference USA Goalkeeper of the Year. Additionally her senior year, she was named First Team All-Conference, United Soccer Coaches All-South Region First Team and Conference USA All-Academic First Team. She was named Conference USA Goalkeeper of the Week two times.
 
In her junior season, Daugherty was an All-Conference USA First Team and All-Academic First Team selection while being named Conference USA Goalkeeper of the Week four times. She also was named to the United Soccer Coaches All-South Region Team and a member of the United Soccer Coaches NCAA Division I Women's Scholar All-South Region Team and United Soccer Coaches NCAA Division I Women's Scholar All-America Third Team.

Club career
In 2018, she played for the Long Island Rough Riders of the UWS, where she was a team Player of the Year candidate, making 41 saves over the 10 game season.

In 2019, Daugherty was eligible for the 2019 NWSL College Draft.
 
Although Daugherty went undrafted, she received tryouts with a pair of teams: North Carolina Courage and Washington Spirit.

While trialing with the Washington Spirit, Daugherty met former Wake Forest All-American Aubrey Bledsoe, who previously played with Danish club Fortuna Hjørring of the Elitedivisionen and connected her with the club, who proceeded to sign her to a contract. She got injured on the October 30, 2019, in the Round of 16 at the 2019–20 UEFA Women's Champions League against Olympique Lyonnais.

In 2020, she joined the Chicago Red Stars of the National Women's Soccer League on a short-term contract.

In 2021, she signed with Swedish club Djurgårdens IF.

On August 15, 2022, Daugherty transferred to Racing Louisville FC of the National Women's Soccer League.

References

External links
 
 Kvindeligaen truppen – Fortuna Hjørring

1996 births
Living people
People from Kennesaw, Georgia
Sportspeople from Cobb County, Georgia
Soccer players from Georgia (U.S. state)
American women's soccer players
Women's association football midfielders
UAB Blazers women's soccer players
Fortuna Hjørring players
American expatriate women's soccer players
American expatriate sportspeople in Denmark
Expatriate women's footballers in Denmark
Chicago Red Stars players
Djurgårdens IF Fotboll (women) players
Expatriate women's footballers in Sweden
American expatriate sportspeople in Sweden
Racing Louisville FC players
Long Island Rough Riders (USL W League) players